Colin Miller (born August 21, 1971) is a Canadian retired professional ice hockey player. He played 276 games in the International Hockey League, primarily with the Atlanta Knights, and 213 games in the ECHL, mostly with the Dayton Bombers.

Career
Miller was born August 21, 1971 in Grimsby, Ontario. He began playing junior ice hockey with the Kanata Valley Lasers in the 1987–88 season, and scored 36 goals. He was drafted into the Ontario Hockey League, 30th overall in 1988, by the Toronto Marlboros. Miller scored 32 goals for the Niagara Falls Thunder in the 1988–89 OHL season, and was traded to the Sault Ste. Marie Greyhounds during the 1989–90 OHL season. He played in the 1991 Memorial Cup, and the 1992 Memorial Cup with the Greyhounds. In the 1992 tournament, Miller was awarded the George Parsons Trophy as the most sportsmanlike player, and named to the Memorial Cup All-Star Team. In four OHL seasons, he scored 123 goals, 222 assists, and 345 points.

Miller began playing professionally with Atlanta in the 1992–93 IHL season, and won the Turner Cup in the 1993–94 IHL season with the Knights. In the following season, he played on four teams, including Atlanta, the Knoxville Cherokees, the Las Vegas Thunder, and the Indianapolis Ice. Miller settled in with the Dayton Bombers in the 1995–96 ECHL season, and remained there for four seasons until the 1998–99 ECHL season, except for a one-game call-up in the 1996–97 season with Michigan K-Wings. Miller was the centerman on the Bombers top line each season, playing 271 games, and scoring 83 goals, 192 assists, and 275 points with Dayton.

Retirement
After playing, Miller spent time as the head coach of University of Dayton club hockey team. He was inducted into the Dayton Hockey Hall of Fame in 2004. The Bombers hired Miller as an assistant coach for the 2005–06 ECHL season. Miller has also worked as a golf professional at the Miami Valley Golf Club.

Career statistics
Career regular season and playoffs statistics.

References

1971 births
Atlanta Knights players
Canadian golf instructors
Canadian ice hockey centres
Dayton Bombers players
Ice hockey people from Ontario
Indianapolis Ice players
Kalamazoo Wings (1974–2000) players
Knoxville Cherokees players
Las Vegas Thunder players
Living people
Niagara Falls Thunder players
People from Grimsby, Ontario
Sault Ste. Marie Greyhounds players